De Sade (German: Das Ausschweifende Leben des Marquis De Sade) is a 1969 American-German drama film directed by Cy Endfield and starring Keir Dullea, Senta Berger and Lilli Palmer. It is based on the life of Donatien Alphonse François, Marquis de Sade, named Louis Alphonse Donatien in the film.

Dullea, in his first film role since the 1968 release of 2001: A Space Odyssey, plays the title character in a film characterized by its psychedelic imagery and go-go sensibilities. As the dying Marquis recalls his life out of sequence, he is terrorized by his uncle and haunted by his own past of debauchery.

It was shot at the Spandau Studios in Berlin and the Bavaria Studios in Munich. The film's sets were designed by the art director Hans Jürgen Kiebach.

Plot
The middle-aged Marquis de Sade arrives at his ancestral estate of La Coste, having escaped incarceration. In the theater at the castle, he meets his uncle, the Abbe, who persuades him to stay to watch an entertainment that has been prepared for him. The play is a parody of the Marquis' parents haggling with M. and Mme. Montreuil over the prospective marriage of their children, leading to a flashback in time to the actual negotiations.

The young Louis flees the proposed marriage to Mlle. Renée de Montreuil, but returns and marries her under threat of imprisonment. Louis would prefer Renée's younger sister Anne, finding Renée to be very frightened and cold to his charms. At an orgy with several young prostitutes, Louis begins to get very rough in his play and explains some of his philosophy to the women, leading to the first in a long series of imprisonments.

Released into the custody of his mother-in-law Mme. de Montreuil, Louis finds himself a prisoner in his own home.  When Anne is sent away to a convent school, Louis begins liaisons first with his mother-in-law's protégé, Mlle. Collette, and then with an actress, La Beauvoisin, for whom he builds a theater at La Coste. The first play performed is for the benefit of the Abbe, who is chagrined to see that the performance is about his own misuse of the young boy Louis. In a flashback, the actual event is played out, the Marquis's later deeds and philosophy thus being given a cold-Freudian origin.

Louis proceeds through a series of flashbacks involving his father's death, a mysterious and recurring old man, and the baptism day of one of Louis' own children, culminating in the scandal of Rose Keller, a widow whom he ties up and flagellates with a sword. Mme. de Montreuil is forced to pay Rose for her silence, and to send Louis back into exile at La Coste.

Louis continues to pursue Anne, and after an elaborate orgy where he is whipped into unconsciousness, he flees to Italy with the young woman. Returned to prison, Louis is tormented with visions of Mme. de Montreuil disowning Anne and his uncle the Abbe seducing her. Mme. de Montreuil visits him in prison, and tearfully tells him he has ruined her family and that he will remain imprisoned forever.

Back on the stage, a mock trial is held where the Marquis is accused of murdering Anne. The mysterious old man is present at the proceedings, and Anne herself appears to accuse Louis of her murder. Louis ruefully remembers Anne's death in Italy from the plague. An older Louis talks with Renée about their misfortunes and regrets, telling her he can find no meaning in life.
At another drunken and destructive debauchery, Louis begins to see visions of Renée in the midst of his revel. The old man lies on his death bed in prison, crying out for Renee's forgiveness. It is revealed that the old man is the Marquis himself, following the young Marquis through his memories as he seeks his one moment of reality. Deciding to look one last time, the old man closes his eyes as the scene cuts back the middle-aged Marquis arriving at La Coste.

Cast

 Keir Dullea as Louis Alphonse Donatien de Sade
 Max Kiebach (uncredited) as young Louis
 Senta Berger as Anne de Montreuil
 John Huston as Abbé de Sade
 Lilli Palmer as Mme. de Montreuil
 Anna Massey as Renée de Montreuil
 Sonja Ziemann as La Beauvoisin
 Christiane Krüger as Laura, Louis' mistress
 Uta Levka as Rose Keller
 Barbara Stanek as Colette
 Susanne von Almassy as Louis' mother
 Friedrich Schoenfelder as Louis' father
 Herbert Weissbach as M. de Montreuil
 Maria Caleita (uncredited) as Marie
 Barboura Morris (uncredited) as Nun

Development
AIP announced they would make the film in 1967 to be based on Theatre of Horrors, an unpublished novel by Louis M. Heyward.

Among the original directors discussed for the film were Michael Reeves and Gordon Hessler. Roger Corman worked on the script with Richard Matheson but was worried about being unable to show the fantasies, and disappointing the audience if they did not. He walked away and AIP hired Cy Endfield instead. Endfield changed the structure of Matheson's script, making it chronological and turning sequences that were fantasies in the script into actual events.

During production it was announced that AIP would make De Sade and also Justine from the novel by De Sade.<ref>"AIP Budgets $5,000,000 for two major feature", Box Office 1 April 1968</ref>

Production
Endfield came down with flu during filming and had to go to hospital. Corman was called in to replace him for the rest of the shoot. John Huston expressed dismay that he had not been asked to direct the film. Corman later claimed that AIP did not pay him what he felt he was owed for his work on the film, contributing to him leaving the company.

Connections to real life
In real life, Sade was meant to be baptized with the name Donatien-Aldonse-Louis; neither of his parents were present at the ceremony, and the name Donatien-Alphonse-Francois was given to him in error. In his life, he used a number of pseudonyms and variations on his true name. During the French Revolution, he called himself simply "Louis Sade."

Reception
Critical
Vincent Canby of The New York Times wrote that the film "is not quite as silly as it looks and sounds, but it comes very close. It successfully reduces one of the most fascinating figures of world literature to the role of not-so-straight man in a series of naughty tableaux vivants." Variety called it "a dramatically compelling, creative and artful film" but warned, "True sado-masochists will be disappointed" because "the orgy scenes are silly, not obscene or erotic. And there is nothing shown or even suggested that is terrible enough to jail a man for life." Gene Siskel of the Chicago Tribune gave the film half of one star out of four and wrote, "Titillation is the name of this celluloid garbage, but even members of the bit and bridle set will be turned off by Keir Dullea ripping open pillows and pouring wine over harlots." Charles Champlin of the Los Angeles Times reported that the film was "not all that great as a skin-flick" and called Huston's performance "curiously energyless" and Dullea "incredibly phlegmatic." Gary Arnold of The Washington Post described the film as "rather dull" and "a dreary theatrical pageant," with Dullea giving a "ludicrous" performance that "resembles nothing so much as Johnny Carson doing a take-off on de Sade." Richard Combs of The Monthly Film Bulletin wrote that De Sade "both confirms and confounds expectations. An intellectually ambitious script by Richard Matheson mingles with some hideously tinted slow motion orgies; John Huston's magnificently decayed Abbé and Keir Dullea's own variety of mental torment play well against each other but in the end fail to clarify very much about de Sade and his obsessions."De Sade'' currently holds an 11% approval rating on Rotten Tomatoes based on 9 reviews, with an average rating of 3.9/10.

Box office
Samuel Z. Arkoff of AIP said in 1974 that the film was his company's biggest flop to date. It grossed $1,250,000, more than other AIP films, but lost more money because of the large advertising bill.

Soundtrack
A record album of the soundtrack music by Billy Strange was released in 1969 by Capitol Records (ST-5170). It has never been released on CD.

Paperback novelization
A novelization of Richard Matheson's screenplay was written by Edward Fenton under the pseudonym he almost always employed for media tie-in work, Henry Clement. It was released by Signet Books in September 1969. Ironically, under his own by-line, Fenton was best known as an author of books for children.

See also
 List of American films of 1969

References

External links
 
 

1969 films
1960s biographical drama films
1960s erotic drama films
1960s historical drama films
American biographical drama films
American erotic drama films
American historical drama films
West German films
German biographical drama films
German erotic drama films
German historical films
1960s English-language films
English-language German films
Films directed by Cy Endfield
Films directed by Roger Corman
Films directed by Gordon Hessler
Films with screenplays by Richard Matheson
Films about the Marquis de Sade
Films set in France
Films set in the 18th century
Films shot in Bavaria
Films shot in Berlin
American independent films
American International Pictures films
German independent films
Films shot at Bavaria Studios
Films shot at Spandau Studios
1969 independent films
1969 drama films
BDSM in films
1960s American films
1960s German films